Otinoidea is a superfamily of very small, air-breathing sea snails and sea slugs, marine pulmonate gastropod mollusks.

Families
Families within the superfamily Otinoidea:
 Otinidae
 Smeagolidae

References

Panpulmonata